The Dalbandin Rifles is a paramilitary regiment forming part of the Pakistani Frontier Corps Balochistan (South). It is named after the town of Dalbandin in Chagai District, Balochistan, Pakistan.

The regiment was involved in controversy in August 2019 when a major was jailed for bribery in relation to a missing persons case.

Units

 Headquarters Wing
 56 Wing
 58 Wing
 106 Wing
 113 Wing
 125 Wing
 126 Wing
 128 Wing
 133 Wing
 146 Wing

References

Regiments of the Frontier Corps
Frontier Corps Balochistan (South)